The 2022–2023 mpox outbreak in North America is a part of the outbreak of human mpox caused by the West African clade of the monkeypox virus. The outbreak reached North America on 18 May 2022, when the United States reported their first case of mpox.  20 North American countries and territories have confirmed cases.

Background 

An ongoing outbreak of mpox was confirmed on May 6, 2022, beginning with a British resident who, after travelling to Nigeria (where the disease is endemic), presented symptoms consistent with mpox on 29 April 2022. The resident returned to the United Kingdom on May 4, creating the country's index case of the outbreak. The origin of several of the cases of mpox in the United Kingdom is unknown. Some monitors saw community transmission taking place in the London area as of mid-May, but it has been suggested that cases were already spreading in Europe in the previous months.

Transmission 

A large portion of those infected were believed to have not recently traveled to areas of Africa where mpox is normally found, such as Nigeria, the Democratic Republic of the Congo as well as central and western Africa. It is believed to be transmitted by close contact with sick people, with extra caution for those individuals with lesions on their skin or genitals, along with their bedding and clothing. The CDC has also stated that individuals should avoid contact and consumption of dead animals such as rats, squirrels, monkeys and apes along with wild game or lotions derived from animals in Africa.

In addition to more common symptoms, such as fever, headache, swollen lymph nodes, and rashes or lesions, some patients have also experienced proctitis, an inflammation of the rectum lining. CDC has also warned clinicians to not rule out mpox in patients with sexually transmitted infections since there have been reports of co-infections with syphilis, gonorrhea, chlamydia, and herpes.

Timeline

Arrival 

An index case was imported into the United States on 18 May 2022, by a man who had recently travelled to Canada. He was admitted to a hospital in Massachusetts, likely on 17 May. The day after, the man was confirmed to have contracted mpox. The following day, another mpox case was confirmed, and the United States reported these cases to the World Health Organization (WHO) and the Centers for Disease Control and Prevention (CDC).

Cases transited through North America

May

19 May 

On 19 May, Canada confirmed the first two cases of mpox. Health officials revealed that there was a link between the U.S. case of mpox in Massachusetts and a few of the suspected cases in the Montreal region. The patient of unknown gender or age, may have been infected when recently traveling to Canada. The spread was likely through skin-to-skin contact picked up abroad.

28 May 
On 28 May, Mexico registered its first case of mpox. It was in a 50-year-old male who resides in the city of New York City and is being treated at Mexico City. It was noted that he may have contracted the disease abroad, from the Netherlands, where there it had already been affected by mpox. It was likely picked up by skin-to-skin contact picked up abroad.

June

29 June 
On 29 June, Puerto Rico, a US Territory, confirmed its first case of mpox. It was likely in a male, age between 20 and 50 years old. It is unknown how it was contracted, but likely skin-to-skin contact picked up abroad.

30 June 
On 30 June, the Bahamas confirmed its first mpox case in a male visitor in his 40s who had most likely contracted the disease from a trip to London, UK, which had already been affected by the mpox outbreak on 9 June. It was likely picked up from skin-to-skin contact abroad.

July

5 July 
On 5 July, Panama received its first mpox infection in a resident of unknown gender and age who most likely contracted the disease via contact with tourists from Europe, which had already been affected by the mpox outbreak. It was likely skin-to-skin contact rather than sexual contact.

6 July 
On 6 July, Jamaica registered its first mpox case. It was in a male of unknown age who had most likely contracted the disease from a trip to London, UK, which had already been affected by the mpox outbreak. It was likely picked up from skin-to-skin contact abroad.

On the same day, the Dominican Republic also confirmed its first case of mpox. It was in a 25-year-old male who had most likely contracted the disease via contact with a person who was infected with mpox in the United States. It was likely skin-to-skin contact rather than sexual contact.

16 July 
On 16 July, Barbados confirmed its first mpox infection. It was in a Barbadian patient of unknown gender in his 30s. It is unknown how the patient contracted the disease, but likely via skin-to-skin contact abroad.

17 July 
On 17 July, Martinique, part of Overseas France and a Single territorial collectivity and an Overseas Department of France, received its first mpox case. It was in an adult of unknown exact age and gender who most likely contracted the disease from a trip to a country which had been affected by the mpox outbreak. It was likely picked up via skin-to-skin contact abroad.

20 July 
On 20 July, Costa Rica recorded its first mpox infection. It was in a 34-year-old male from the United States who resided in Costa Rica for 2 years. He most likely contracted it from a trip to the United States abroad and is considered an imported case. It was likely picked up via skin-to-skin contact.

22 July 
On 22 July, Bermuda, a British Overseas Territory, although technically part of North America, registered its first mpox case. It is unknown what the patient's gender and age is and how the patient contracted the disease, but it was likely via skin-to-skin contact abroad.

25 July 
On 25 July, Guadeloupe, part of Overseas France and an Overseas Department of France, confirmed its first case of mpox. It was in a patient of unknown gender or age who resides in Guadeloupe. The patient recently travelled to France and likely contracted the disease via contact with someone in France. It was likely skin-to-skin contact rather than sexual contact.

August

1 August 
On 1 August, Collectivity of Saint Martin, part of Overseas France, confirmed its first case of mpox. It was in a patient of unknown gender or age who's residence is unknown. It is unknown how it was contracted, however it may be likely that it was picked up via skin-to-skin contact abroad.

3 August 
On 3 August, Guatemala registered its first case of mpox. It was in a 31-year-old male who had likely contracted the disease via contact with foreigners/tourists from another country. It was likely skin-to-skin contact rather than sexual contact.

9 August 
On 9 August, Greenland reported its first two cases of mpox. It was in patients of unknown genders and ages who likely contracted the disease via skin-to-skin contact picked up abroad.

12 August 
On 12 August, Honduras reported its first case of mpox in an adult male under 50 years of age. It is unknown how the male contracted the disease, although it was likely picked up via contact with other infected abroad.

19 August 
On 19 August, Curacao confirmed its first case of mpox in a patient of unknown gender and age who likely contracted the disease abroad, via skin-to-skin contact or sexual contact with others.

20 August 
On 20 August, Cuba reported its first mpox infection. It was in a male Italian tourist of unknown gender. He most likely contracted the disease from a trip to Italy and other various destinations in the Caribbean. It is unknown how the disease was contracted, but likely via skin-to-skin contact rather than sexual contact.

The man fell into cardiac arrest, likely on the same day he was diagnosed, which he recovered from, but remained in critical condition at the time. He later died on 21 August after rapidly deteriorating. This marked Cuba's first death, as well as North America's first death during the ongoing outbreak.

22 August 
On 22 August, Aruba reported its first case of mpox. It was in a patient of unknown age and gender who resides in Aruba. It is unknown how the patient contracted the disease, but likely contracted the disease abroad, via skin-to-skin contact or sexual contact with others.

Responses

World Health Organization (WHO)
On 20 May, the WHO convened an emergency meeting of independent advisers to discuss the outbreak and assess the threat level. Its European chief, Hans Kluge, expressed concern that infections could accelerate in Europe as people gather for parties and festivals over the summer. On 14 June, the WHO announced plans to rename the disease from monkeypox to mpox in order to combat stigma and racism surrounding the disease. Another meeting convened on 23 June determined that the outbreak does not constitute a Public Health Emergency of International Concern for the time being.

Countries
The majority of North American countries responded to the outbreak, and the responses of some are listed below.

Canada: On 21 April, Public Services and Procurement Canada published a tender request seeking to stockpile doses of smallpox vaccine to be prepared in the event of a future accidental or intentional release of the virus. The contract for 500,000 doses closed on 5 May, and was awarded to Bavarian Nordic. On 24 May, the Public Health Agency of Canada stated that they were in the process of extracting Imvamune vaccines from their National Emergency Strategic Stockpile for deployment across the country, starting with the province of Quebec. On 26 May, Quebec announced that Imvamune vaccines would be made available to those who have been in close contact with confirmed or suspected mpox cases. On 7 June, PHAC announced that travellers returning to Canada may be subject to a mandatory quarantine period if they become ill with mpox, and warned that quarantined travellers may have restricted access to health care and delays returning home.
Dominican Republic: In May, the Ministry of Public Health of the Dominican Republic issued a preventive epidemiological alert after mpox was reported in several countries.
Guatemala: On 26 May, the Minister of Health of Guatemala, Francisco Coma, informed that the Ministry declared an epidemiological alert on the borders of the Central American country, with the objective of detecting possible cases of mpox. The minister also mentioned that one of the main transmissions of mpox is from injuries and body fluids as well as contact with contaminated clothing.
Mexico: In May, Mexican health authorities have posted notices in clinics and hospitals for the purpose of identifying suspected cases in the country. In addition, the Ministry of Health has issued an epidemiological alert on 26 May 2022.
United States: On 22 May, President Joe Biden commented "they haven't told me the level of exposure yet but it is something that everybody should be concerned about". National security advisor Jake Sullivan told reporters the US has a vaccine that is relevant to treating mpox. On 25 May, the CDC issued an alert for gay and bisexual men to be especially vigilant. In addition, the CDC placed its mpox travel alert at "Level 2", following reports of cases in Australia and several countries in Europe. Beginning 18 July 2022, Sonic Healthcare USA started testing for mpox using CDC's orthopoxvirus test, which includes monkeypox virus at Sonic Reference Laboratory in Austin, Texas.

We were unable to record Overseas and Dependant territories' response to the outbreak.

Cases per country and territory
This is a table of confirmed and suspected mpox cases in North American countries during the ongoing 2022–2023 mpox outbreak. It does not include countries where suspected cases were reported but later discarded.

Timeline of first confirmed cases by country or territory

Timeline of suspected cases by country or territory 
Countries listed below had only suspected cases at the time of reporting. Some countries reported confirmed cases after reporting suspected cases. Countries listed several times reported suspected cases again after they discarded suspected cases before.

Timeline of first deaths by country or territory 

 20 North American countries and territories have been affected by the outbreak.

See also 

 2022–2023 mpox outbreak
 2022–2023 mpox outbreak in Asia
 2022–2023 mpox outbreak in Europe
 2022–2023 mpox outbreak in South America

Notes

References

External links

North America
Mpox
2022 in North America